Haden Harrison Edwards (1812–1865) was a Texan, born in Virginia but brought to Nacogdoches as a youngster by his father, onetime empresario Haden Edwards. Haden Harrison Edwards worked as a livestock trader, soldier, politician and railroad executive. He founded the Sabine Pass and East Texas Railway and was that company's first president.

Military career
Edwards was already a well-travelled cattle trader when the Texas Revolution broke out. He was soon elected captain of a company of volunteers which served at the Siege of Bexar. Further military service in Indian campaigns after the Revolution led to the Republic of Texas government's appointing him as a brigadier general. After the annexation of Texas, the Texas military was dissolved and its commissions no longer recognized, so when the Mexican–American War subsequently broke out, Edwards enlisted as a private in Company E, Second Regiment of the Texas Mounted Rifles. However, he was granted a discharge due to disability on August 31, 1846.

Politics
Edwards was elected to the 1st Congress of the Republic of Texas as a Representative for a district centered around Nacogdoches.  Following statehood, he was also a member of the 1st and 8th Texas Legislatures, again representing the Nacogdoches area, and also represented that area as a delegate to the Texas Succession Convention, which voted to leave the Union in 1861.

Business
Edwards served as president of the Sabine Pass and East Texas Railway, beginning in 1858.  Construction began and some rails were in place when the outbreak of the American Civil War halted all activity.  Subsequently, the rails which had been laid were taken up and used in the fortification of Sabine Pass.  As soon as the war ended, Edwards began working to revive the railroad, and was in Cincinnati, Ohio in August, 1865 trying to arrange financing for it when he died.

Personal
Edwards married the former Sarah Forbes in Nacogdoches on October 22, 1843. Mrs. Edwards subsequently gave birth to eight children. The eldest, Peyton Foster Edwards (1844–1918), served as a Confederate soldier and then followed his father into the political arena, becoming known as "the red rooster of Nacogdoches", representing the area for two terms in the Texas Senate prior to moving to El Paso.

References

External links

 Edwards, Haden Harrison. Handbook of Texas.

1812 births
1865 deaths
People from Nacogdoches, Texas
Republic of Texas politicians
Texas Revolution
Members of the Texas House of Representatives
19th-century American politicians